Hamr na Jezeře is a municipality and village in Česká Lípa District in the Liberec Region of the Czech Republic. It has about 400 inhabitants. It is known as a recreation centre.

Administrative parts
Villages of Břevniště and Útěchovice are administrative parts of Hamr na Jezeře.

Etymology
The name Hamr na Jezeře literally means "Hammer mill on Lake".

Geography
It lies in the Ralsko Uplands. The Ploučnice River and its arm Hamerská strouha flow through the municipality. The village of Hamr na Jezeře lies on the shores of the Hamerské jezero Pond.

History
The first written mention of Útěchovice, which is the oldest part of the municipality, is from 1322. Hamr na Jezeře was first mentioned in 1544. In the 16th century, a mill on the Ploučnice and several hammer mills were built in the village to process iron ore mined in the nearby area. At the end of the 19th century, Hamr na Jezeře became a spa village and a tourist destination. This era ended in the mid-20th century, when uranium was mined here for a decade. Since 1993, the village has been a tourist destination again.

Demographics

Economy
Hamr na Jezeře is known as a recreation centre. On the shores of the pond there are two campsites and a swimming pool with complete infrastructure and attractions for tourists. The municipality is sometimes nicknamed "Riviera of the North".

Sights

On the Děvín hill, there is a ruin of an eponymous castle. It was a massive royal castle, built in 1250. In the 17th century, it was abandoned, and it was most likely destroyed during the Thirty Years' War.

On the Křížový vrch hill, there is a neo-Gothic Chapel of Our Lady Help of Christians from 1830.

In popular culture
Within the Czech Republic, Hamr na Jezeře was popularized thanks to the successful film Dovolená s Andělem.

References

External links

Villages in Česká Lípa District